T'aechŏn County or Thaechŏn County (in North Korean romanization) is a kun, or county, in central North P'yŏngan province, North Korea.  It borders Taegwan and Tongch'ang to the north, Unsan and Nyŏngbyŏn to the east, Pakch'ŏn and Unjŏn to the south, and Kusŏng to the west.

Geography
Mountains are scattered across the county, with the Pinandŏk mountains rising in the east. The tallest of these is Paegundŏksan (백운덕산, 868 m), but the county's highest point is in the north, at Samgaksan (삼각산, 936 m).  The county is drained by the Taeryŏng River and its tributaries, which include the Ch'ŏnbang and Ch'angsŏng. Some 64% of the county's area is forestland, while 30% is cultivated.

Administrative divisions
T'aech'ŏn county is divided into 1 ŭp (town), 1 rodongjagu (workers' district) and 21 ri (villages):

Climate
On average, there are 40 foggy days per year.

Economy
Crops raised on the cultivated land include maize, rice, tobacco and vegetables; Taechon leads the province in maize production. In addition, various animals are raised including silkworms, rabbits, cattle and hogs. There are numerous deposits of gold and graphite.

Transportation
The Ch'ŏngnyŏn P'arwŏn Line of the Korean State Railway passes through the county, on its way between Kusŏng and Kujang.

There are two airfields in the county - T'aech'ŏn Airport and T'aech'ŏn Northwest Airport.

Places of interest
The Silla-era temple Yanghwasa still stands in T'aech'ŏn.

Educational institutions in T'aech'ŏn include T'aech'ŏn Technical School (태천전문학교).

The construction of the Taechon nuclear power plant was halted in 1994 in accordance with the U.S.-North Korea Agreed Framework.

See also
Geography of North Korea
Administrative divisions of North Korea
North Pyongan

References

External links

Counties of North Pyongan